Battelle Hall (originally known as the Ohio Center) is a 6,864 seat multi-purpose exhibit hall located in Columbus, Ohio, part of the Greater Columbus Convention Center.  It opened as the Ohio Center on September 10, 1980, and although sometimes considered a white elephant because of its small size and seating capacity (concert fans usually found themselves driving to Cincinnati Riverfront Coliseum, Indianapolis Market Square Arena, Detroit Joe Louis Arena, Cleveland Richfield Coliseum or Pittsburgh Mellon Arena), it has been used for a variety of events, including concerts (Conway Twitty, Devo, Elvis Costello & The Attractions, The Stray Cats, Rick Springfield, Kiss (2/19/84), Culture Club, Ratt, The Pointer Sisters, Cyndi Lauper, Billy Idol, Billy Ocean, Richard Marx, Queensrÿche), trade shows, and sporting events such as the 1993 and 1994 Mid-American Conference men's basketball tournaments. The exhibit hall was also the home of professional wrestling cards from the early 1980s to mid-1990s with monthly visits from the WWF and the occasional WCW event. The hall totals  of exhibit space - 65,000 on the main floor and 25,000 on the balcony, and can be divisible into two halls.

The first entertainment event at the facility was comedian Rodney Dangerfield and special guest McGuffey Lane on September 20, 1980 attended by 6,677 persons.

Seating

Unlike arenas, Battelle Hall has no permanent seats. Instead, inexpensive plastic seats attached to metal bleachers are positioned into place for scheduled events.

Seating capacities:
Bleacher seats:
Main floor - 3,116
Balcony - 3,679
Soccer set - 5,074
Concert set (with obstructed seats) - 7,588
Concert set (without obstructed seats) - 6,400
Concert in the round - 7,918
Basketball - 6,500
Ice Show (Ice Capades) - 5,464
North Hall set - 3,801
South Hall set - 2,494

Other Dimensions:
With risers set for concerts - 
Full hall beginning at columns - /
Battelle Hall North - /
Battelle Hall South - /
Balcony railing to Wall - 
From floor to underside balcony - 
Main floor to underside of hoisting grid - 

The exhibit hall features a  portable stage.

See also
Greater Columbus Convention Center
Columbus Capitals (indoor soccer)
Columbus Horizon
Columbus Invaders
Columbus Quest

References

External links
Greater Columbus Convention Center

Convention centers in Ohio
Basketball venues in Columbus, Ohio
Indoor arenas in Columbus, Ohio
Sports venues in Columbus, Ohio